The 2007–08 Cypriot Fourth Division was the 23rd season of the Cypriot fourth-level football league. Digenis Oroklinis won their 1st title.

Format
Fourteen teams participated in the 2007–08 Cypriot Fourth Division. All teams played against each other twice, once at their home and once away. The team with the most points at the end of the season crowned champions. The first three teams were promoted to the 2008–09 Cypriot Third Division and the last three teams were relegated to regional leagues.

Point system
Teams received three points for a win, one point for a draw and zero points for a loss.

Changes from previous season
Teams promoted to 2007–08 Cypriot Third Division
 Spartakos Kitiou
 AEK Kouklia
 Anagennisi Trachoniou

Teams relegated from 2006–07 Cypriot Third Division
 Digenis Oroklinis
 FC Episkopi
 SEK Agiou Athanasiou

Teams promoted from regional leagues
 ASPIS Pylas
 Ellinismos Akakiou
 P.O. Xylotymvou

Teams relegated to regional leagues
 AEK Kythreas
 AOL/Omonia Lakatamias
 Thiella Dromolaxia

League standings

Results

See also
 Cypriot Fourth Division
 2007–08 Cypriot First Division
 2007–08 Cypriot Cup

Sources

Cypriot Fourth Division seasons
Cyprus
2007–08 in Cypriot football